Celon is a commune in the Indre department in central France.

Population

See also
Communes of the Indre department
Saint-Benoit-du-Sault

References

Communes of Indre
Bituriges Cubi